Hersheypark Stadium is a stadium located in Hershey, Pennsylvania, on the grounds of Hersheypark. It opened on May 18, 1939.

It is used as a sporting facility, concert venue and location for various other large functions (including a birthday gala for President Dwight D. Eisenhower). In addition, it hosted the 2004 Presidential Race Campaign stop for President George W. Bush.

It also hosts the Cavalcade of Bands and Tournament of Bands Atlantic Coast Championship marching band competitions, every November.

The stadium hosted the final round of the 2000 CONCACAF Men's Pre-Olympic Tournament for the 2000 Summer Olympics.  Two berths were afforded for the Olympics for CONCACAF members, and the United States and Honduras qualified by winning their semifinal matches in the qualification tournament.  The stadium has hosted the U.S. men's national soccer team on one occasion, a 3–1 victory over Poland on May 9, 1990.

Ice hockey
Hersheypark Stadium hosted the fourth annual AHL Outdoor Classic in 2013, with the local Hershey Bears facing the Wilkes-Barre/Scranton Penguins. The "Baby Pens" defeated the Bears in front of a capacity crowd of 17,311 fans by a score of 2–1.

International soccer

Events

 Concert rescheduled due to thunderstorm evacuation.

See also
Big 33 Football Classic
Hershey High School
Star Pavilion

References

External links
Official website (archived, 9 Nov 2013)

Hershey, Pennsylvania
Hersheypark
High school football venues in the United States
Ice hockey venues in Pennsylvania
Soccer venues in Pennsylvania
Sports venues in Pennsylvania
Buildings and structures in Dauphin County, Pennsylvania
Sports venues in Harrisburg, Pennsylvania
Hershey Entertainment and Resorts Company